Mikoyan Bay (Zaliv Mikoyana) is a bay in Severnaya Zemlya, Krasnoyarsk Krai, Russia. It is clogged by ice most of the year with many icebergs in the strait off the mouth of the bay.

History
This bay was named by the 1930–1932 expedition to the archipelago led by Georgy Ushakov and Nikolay Urvantsev after Soviet statesman Anastas Mikoyan (1895–1978).

Geography
Mikoyan Bay is a body of water in the northeastern area of Bolshevik Island, the southernmost island of Severnaya Zemlya. It is located southwest of Cape Unslicht on the Shokalsky Strait shore of the island. The headland on the western side of the mouth of the bay is Cape Baranov.

The basin inside the bay has smooth mountains on both flanks. Mikoyan Bay is about 5.5 km wide, the shores of both sides running almost parallel to each other southwards from its mouth. There are two little islets in the bay, Dvukh Tovarishchey close to the eastern coast, and smaller Sportivnyy  further south.

See also
List of fjords of Russia

References

External links

Eurasian Arctic Tectonics - DiVA
New geochronological data on Palaeozoic igneous activity and deformation in the Severnaya Zemlya Archipelago, Russia, and implications for the development of the Eurasian Arctic margin, Geological Magazine

Bays of Severnaya Zemlya
Bays of the Laptev Sea